No Reason to Complain is a stand up comedy performance by comedian Patton Oswalt, released on DVD by Comedy Central.

Home media
The special was released on DVD by Comedy Central on April 4, 2006. It includes special features including deleted scenes and is completely uncensored and uncut (in contrast to the Comedy Central TV special of the same performance).

References

2006 films